Love in Sun Moon Lake (Chinese:愛在日月潭), also known as Ai Zai Ri Yue Tan, is a Chinese television series about the family connections between the two shores of China and Taiwan.  It stars Taiwanese actress Ruby Lin and Mainland actor Wen Zhang. It was first aired in China on Beijing Television on 20 July 2009.

Storyline
Jiang Zhong He start to searching of his family roots after his great-aunt's death for 50 years of separation and lovesickness between his great-aunt and great-uncle. With his great-aunt's aborigine wooden totem necklace given by his great-uncle, Jiang Zhong He meets An-An in Taiwan, who also wears the same necklace. An-An is a passionate Taiwanese aborigine princess. She carries much on her shoulders, trying to support the local orphanage through her job and seeking corporate sponsors. An-An has a rich boyfriend, Meng Ting. He prepares for his wedding with An-An, although his mother objects strongly to their union.  After getting to know Zhong He, An-An slowly falls in love with Zhong He, but in their hearts they cannot take their love a step further.

Cast
Ruby Lin as An An
Wen Zhang as Meng Ting 
Ke Shu Yuan as Jiang Zhong He
Jiang Xin as Jiang He
Zhao Jing as Li Chao Xiang
Xiao Xiao Bin as Tuo Tuo
Ren Dong Lin as Fu Kang Lin
Ye Qing Qing as Ai Li
Tian Li as Liu Yi Yi
Huang Xiao Li as Jiang Feng Shi
Yao Dai Wei as Zhuang Man Mei
Qin Yan as Zhan Sen

Production
20 June 2008, Taiwan government information office bureau chief Shi Yaping expressed that they will deregulate the policy regarding mainland actors coming to Taiwan. The first to benefit is "Love in Sun Moon Lake," 16 of its mainland cast and crew members have obtained official work permits to come to Taiwan.

Featured songs
Jian Chi Ai  performed by Wen Zhang 
Wang Ji Ni Bu Ru Shi Qu Ni (忘记你不如失去你) performed by Yang Pei An

Trivia
 Investment by China People's Daily. 
 Initially, Taiwanese Actor Ming Dao was selected for the role of Meng Ting but it went to Wen Zhang eventually. 
 First Chinese TV series obtained official work permits to come to Taiwan.

See also
 Nationality Law of the People's Republic of China

External links
 Sina official page
 ent163.com page

References

2009 Chinese television series debuts
Chinese romance television series
2009 Chinese television series endings